Timo Mikko Juhani Turunen (born April 8, 1948 in Kuusjärvi, Finland) is a Finnish retired professional ice hockey player who played in the SM-liiga.  He played for Jokerit.  He was inducted into the Finnish Hockey Hall of Fame in 2004.

Playing career
Most notably Turunen was part of Jokerit's top line which consisted of Pentti Hiiros and Timo Kyntölä. Due to the line's short height (Hiiros was the tallest at 172 cm of height), the line was nicknamed "Nallipyssy-ketju", "The Cap-Gun line".

Even though, Turunen was a prolific player for Jokerit and he served as the captain of the team for two separate occasions.

Turunen ended his playing career in 1981.

External links
 Finnish Hockey Hall of Fame bio

1948 births
Living people
Finnish ice hockey centres
Ice hockey players at the 1972 Winter Olympics
Jokerit players
Olympic ice hockey players of Finland
People from Outokumpu
Ässät coaches
Sportspeople from North Karelia